Scott Free is an album by American jazz drummer Max Roach recorded in 1984 for the Italian Soul Note label.

Reception
The Allmusic review by Scott Yanow awarded the album 3½ stars stating "This is excellent music, easily recommended as an example of the underrated but consistently brilliant Max Roach Quartet".

Track listing
All compositions by Cecil Bridgewater
 "Scott Free Part 1" - 19:58 
 "Scott Free Part 2" - 20:17 
Recorded at Barigozzi Studio in Milano, Italy on May 31, 1984

Personnel
Max Roach - drums
Cecil Bridgewater - trumpet, flugelhorn
Odean Pope - tenor saxophone
Tyrone Brown - bass

References

Black Saint/Soul Note albums
Max Roach albums
1984 albums